The Abraham Coult House is a historic house at 1695 Hebron Avenue in Glastonbury, Connecticut.  Built about 1706 and enlarged several times, it is a well-preserved colonial residence, exhibiting changing construction methods through its alterations.  Moved in the 1970s to avoid demolition and restored, it was listed on the National Register of Historic Places in 2000.

Description and history
The Abrahm Coult House is located in a rural-suburban area of central northern Glastonbury, on the north side of Hebron Road (Connecticut Route 94). It is a -story wood-frame structure, with a side-gable roof, central chimney, clapboarded exterior, and concrete block foundation. Its main facade faces southwest, and is five bays wide, with a center entrance framed by Greek Revival pilasters and topped by a multilight transom window and corniced entablature. The interior follows an early colonial central chimney plan, with a narrow entrance vestibule which also has a winding dogleg staircase. There are parlors on either side of the chimney, and the kitchen extends across most of the rear. Original 18th-century woodwork is retained in most of the chambers, but plasterwork and other surfaces have been replaced as part of a 1970s restoration.

The house as built about 1706, when the land it originally stood on (closer to Hebron Street) was purchased by Abraham Coult, Sr.  The house was held in the Coult family only until 1739, and had a succession of private owners. By the 1960s, it had come into the hands of the local water supply authority, and was vacant and deteriorated. It was sold in 1972 for $500, on condition that it be moved. This was accomplished despite fire damaged caused by vandals during preparations for the move.

See also
List of the oldest buildings in Connecticut
National Register of Historic Places listings in Hartford County, Connecticut

References

Houses on the National Register of Historic Places in Connecticut
National Register of Historic Places in Hartford County, Connecticut
Colonial architecture in the United States
Houses completed in 1706
Houses in Hartford County, Connecticut
Glastonbury, Connecticut